Barco is the common Spanish word for ship. Barco may also refer to:

Technology 
Barco (manufacturer), a Belgian multinational display hardware manufacturer
Barco ETS, former name of Ucamco, a Belgian multinational printed circuit board software and hardware manufacturer
Barco ColorTone, a stripped-down version of the Barco Creator image manipulation program
Barco Creator, an image manipulation program targeted at the repro and print shop markets
Barco Strike!, a vector-based drawing program targeted at the repro and print shop markets

People 
 Barco (surname)

Towns and villages 
Barco, Covilhã, a village in the Covilhã Municipality of the Castelo Branco District of Portugal
Barco, Guimarães, a village in the Guimarães Municipality of the Braga District of Portugal 
Barco, North Carolina, an unincorporated community in the United States
Barcial del Barco, a municipality in the province of Zamora, Castile and León, Spain
Manzanal del Barco, a municipality in the province of Zamora, Castile and León, Spain
Nava del Barco, a municipality in the province of Ávila, Castile and León, Spain
O Barco de Valdeorras, a municipality in the Galicia region of north-west Spain
Soto del Barco, a small, coastal municipality in the Principality of Asturias, Spain
Soto del Barco (parish), one of five parishes (administrative divisions) in Soto del Barco

Other 
Barco Law Building, housing the University of Pittsburgh School of Law
Barco oil concession, a major oilfield in Colombia, now depleted
CD Barco, a Spanish football team based in O Barco de Valdeorras
Lake Barco, a lake in Putnam County, Florida, United States
Laguna del Barco, a lake in the Sierra de Gredos near the town of El Barco de Ávila

See also
 El Barco (disambiguation)